The Canadian Coalition for Global Health Research is a Canada-based global network of people and institutions committed to promoting better and more equitable health worldwide through the production and use of knowledge.

History 
The Coalition, a registered Canadian charity and is governed by a volunteer Board of Directors, began in 2001 as an informal network and has evolved through generous support from the Canadian International Development Agency, the Canadian Institutes of Health Research, Health Canada, the International Development Research Centre and other foundations.

Among the many, few of the facts that provoked founders of the Coalition to start this initiative were:
Global Health Inequities: Millions of people worldwide do not have access to essential health services. For example, each year 8 million children die needlessly and half a million mothers die unnecessarily during pregnancy;
The 'Know-Do' Gap: Much knowledge about what could make a difference is available, but individuals and institutions in developing countries often do not have access to this information, or lack the capacity to apply this knowledge
The '10/90' Gap: According to the Global Forum for Health Research, only 10% of the world's health research funding goes towards addressing the most pressing health issues affecting the poorest 90% of the world's population
Limited Linkages between Researchers and Policymakers: There are few incentives for individual researchers to connect their knowledge with larger processes. Researchers often believe that their work is finished when it is published. Similarly, policymakers often do not seek out existing knowledge that may be of critical value to their policies.
Lack of Capacities: Capacities to produce and use health knowledge, at the individual, institutional and system levels in developing countries, are weak
Need for greater coordination amongst Canadians: Canada has tremendous and unique expertise and resources to address these issues, but Canadian efforts are often fragmented. Our collective understanding about how to collaborate more effectively, including with developing country partners, is limited.

Focus 
With a general orientation towards the health-research challenges in low- and middle income countries (LMICs), and guided by the overarching goal of reducing disparities in health outcomes, the Coalition focuses on:
strengthening the capacity of global health researchers, institutions and systems
actively coordinating, brokering, partnering, mentoring and facilitating among global, national and local actors
influencing the policy process within and between high-income countries (HICs) and low- and middle-income countries (LMICs)
strengthening a network of connected, dynamic members in Canada, LMICs and HICs
incubating teams (groups) pursuing a particular global health research issue and then devolving responsibilities to HIC and LMIC institutions
learning lessons, thinking evaluatively, and communicating its work

Programs 
CCGHR has been undertaking numerous initiatives under the following programmatic areas.

Capacity development 
Here we concentrate on strengthening the knowledge and skills of individuals, institutions and "systems" to produce, synthesize and use global health research. Programs under this area include our well-regarded Coalition Institutes, a series of global health research forums, and a country partnerships program, in which we work with partners in Cameroon, Central America, Mongolia, Zambia and elsewhere to strengthen research capacities. This special initiative features an innovative, globally-relevant approach to strengthening knowledge-based national health systems through country-specific partnerships. New activities under development in this program area include mentorship and leadership programs for global health research. Harmonization of Canadian Global Health Research Activities at a Country Level is the other initiative that promotes better coordination of overseas development investments related to health research. The aim of this project is encouraging Canadian global health researchers to collaborate for a more effective and efficient Canadian response to health research needs in low and middle-income countries (LMICs). Deliverables from the pilot project included country dossiers outlined information on people, projects, and institutions for a given country as well as an overall "Resource Directory" providing links to relevant documents on harmonization in global health. Uganda, Cameroon, Honduras, and Zambia were part of the pilot project while Tanzania, Mongolia, and Ethiopia are identified for the creation of new dossiers.

Policy influence 
This program aims to create greater support for global health research by influencing institutional, national and global policies. With the aim of improving and promoting Canada's role in global health research, this program area focuses on the emerging field of knowledge translation, and pioneers techniques of bringing producers and users of research together. The program also works to share results with audiences in Canada and beyond.

Networking 
The Coalition's membership—both individual and institutional—is the primary vehicle for driving our spirit of innovation and learning. This program provides incentives to ensure dynamic network participation among members using innovative information and communication methods. We also aim to promote effective, respectful and sustainable "South-Canada" research partnerships to address and solve problems that affect us all.

References

External links
The Canadian Coalition for Global Health Research (CCGHR)
Summer Institute - CCGHR
Knowledge to Action: Identifying BC’s Contributions to Global Health Research

Health charities in Canada